Brownlee is a village in the Canadian province of Saskatchewan within the Rural Municipality of Eyebrow No. 193 and Census Division No. 7. The village is located approximately 58 km northwest of the City of Moose Jaw on Highway 42.

History 
Brownlee incorporated as a village on December 29, 1908.

Demographics 

See also 

 List of communities in Saskatchewan
 Villages of Saskatchewan

References

Villages in Saskatchewan
Eyebrow No. 193, Saskatchewan
Division No. 7, Saskatchewan